Schizura is a genus of prominent moths in the family Notodontidae. There are about eight described species in Schizura.

Some species in this genus have been transferred to the genera Coelodasys and Oedemasia as a result of research published in 2021.

Species
These eight species belong to the genus Schizura:
 Schizura badia (Packard, 1864) (chestnut schizura)
 Schizura biedermani Barnes & McDunnough, 1911
 Schizura ipomaeae Doubleday, 1841 (morning-glory prominent)
 Schizura madara Schaus, 1939
 Schizura manca Schaus, 1912
 Schizura matheri Miller & Franclemont, 2021
 Schizura obligata (Dyar, 1919)
 Schizura pelialis Schaus, 1937

References

Notodontidae